Roseau High School is a public high school in Roseau, Minnesota, United States serving students from grades 7 through 12. It is part of Roseau Community Schools, Minnesota ISD 682. The school's hockey program has matriculated several NHL and Olympic hockey players.

Notable people

Alumni
 Mike Baumgartner (Class of 1967)  NHL player
 Earl Anderson (Class of 1968)  NHL player
 Dale Smedsmo (Class of 1967)  NHL player
 Neal Broten (Class of 1977)  1980 US Olympic hockey team member, NHL player, greatest Minnesota born hockey player
 Aaron Broten (Class of 1978)  NHL player
 Butsy Erickson (Class of 1978)  NHL player
 Paul Broten (Class of 1984)  NHL player
 Josh Olson (Class of 1999)  NHL player
 Dustin Byfuglien (2001) (transferred out)  NHL player
 Aaron Ness (Class of 2008)  NHL player, New York Islanders

Faculty
 Dean Blais  1990–1991 boys' hockey coach
 Dan Fabian  member of the Minnesota House of Representatives, teacher since 1976
 Harold Paulsen  1940s boys' hockey coach

References 

Public high schools in Minnesota